Martin Russell is an English recording engineer, record producer, composer, and musician. He has been a core member of the music group Afro Celt Sound System since the recording of the first album Volume 1: Sound Magic in mid-1995, and has twice been nominated for a Grammy Award. As of 2010, the recorded output of the group has so far been exclusively released by Peter Gabriel's Real World Records. (The next two albums, Volume 2: Release and Volume 3: Further in Time earned the afore-mentioned Grammy Nominations). The group recorded and released three more albums Seed, Pod (an album of remixes and re-workings), and Volume 5: Anatomic. Russell has written film music for several feature films, including Hotel Rwanda and the Lebanese film Bosta.

History
Russell commenced his musical career in 1979, joining UK band The Enid on bass guitar and keyboards a few months after completing a BA Hons degree in music. His most notable contribution to the band's catalogue was "Once She Was", an arrangement of the folk song melody "Scarborough Fair". He remained a member until 1981, citing his increasing dissatisfaction with the whimsical vocally-based direction that the band was taking, as his reason for leaving. With fellow ex-Enid keyboard player William Gilmour he formed the instrumental rock band Craft, who recorded an album which was released in 1984. He subsequently focused on studio building and sound engineering for the rest of the 1980s, notably at Utopia and Swanyard Studios before designing and building his own studio in North London, England in 1991.

Sonic Innovation opened in 1992 and has been the headquarters for the majority of Russell's music production, recording, CD mastering and film music composition activities ever since.

References
Entry on Afro Celt Sound System fansite
Sonic Innovation Website

Year of birth missing (living people)
Living people
American record producers
American audio engineers
Afro Celt Sound System members
The Enid members